IJG may refer to:
 Islamic Jihad Group, now known as the Islamic Jihad Union, a militant Islamist organization
 Independent JPEG Group, which develops the libjpeg image processing library
 I. J. Good, a British mathematician and cryptologist 
 Ingrid Jespersens Gymnasieskole, private school in Copenhagen, Denmark